Wesley K. Wark (born 1952) is a Canadian historian, an associate professor emeritus of history at the University of Toronto, and a visiting professor at the University of Ottawa.

Education
Wark earned a B.A. from Carleton University  in 1975, an M.A. from Cambridge University  in 1977 and a Ph.D. from the London School of Economics and Political Science (LSE) in 1984. He was a faculty member at McGill University from 1982 to 1983, at the University of Calgary from 1983 to 1988, and at the University of Toronto from 1988 until his retirement in 2013.

Career
Wark was President of the Canadian Association for Security and Intelligence Studies (CASIS) in 1998-2000 and 2004-2006. He served on the Prime Minister's Advisory Council on National Security (2005-2009).

Wark is a frequent media commentator on national security and intelligence and contemporary security issues. Notably, writing in 2020, Mr. Wark appeared to be unaware that Canada's military had a medical intelligence unit, stating "The Canadian military appears to have no counterpart to the U.S. National Center for Medical Intelligence, which is part of their Defense Intelligence Agency.". Later that year Mr. Wark stated "The Department of National Defence has a small medical intelligence unit, normally utilized to assist in determining health risk in overseas military deployments, but whose expertise could be pressed into service on COVID-19.”  Again in 2021, he discussed Canada's "military medical intelligence branch.". Other scholarly interests include the popular culture of espionage in the contemporary history, the study of terrorism and counter-terrorism and modern and contemporary international relations. He was also a member of the Committee on the Civil Dimension of Security of the NATO Parliamentary Assembly.

Books

 The Ultimate Enemy: British Intelligence and Nazi Germany, 1985
 Security and Intelligence in a Changing World: New Perspectives for the 1990s, (editor with Anthony Stuart Farson and David Stafford), Psychology Press, 1991
 Spy Fiction, Spy Films, and Real Intelligence, 1991 (editor)
 Espionage: Past, Present, Future? Elsevier, 1994 (editor)
 Twenty-First Century Intelligence, Routledge, 2013 (editor)

References

External links
 Human Rights Research and Education Centre Short profile of Wesley Wark, University of Ottawa

Writers from Ottawa
Canadian political scientists
20th-century Canadian historians
Canadian male non-fiction writers
Intelligence analysts
1952 births
Living people
21st-century Canadian historians